The legislative district of General Santos, officially the Lone district of General Santos, is the representation of the highly urbanized city of General Santos in the Congress of the Philippines. The city is represented in the lower house of the Congress through its lone congressional district after the 2022 Philippine general elections.

History 

Prior to gaining separate representation, areas now under the jurisdiction of General Santos were represented under the Department of Mindanao and Sulu (1917–1935), the historical Cotabato Province (1935–1967), Region XI (1978–1984) and South Cotabato (lone district, 1967–1972; at-large district, 1984–1986; first district, 1987–2019).

Even after becoming a highly urbanized city independent from South Cotabato in 1988, General Santos remained part of the province's congressional representation. The city only gained a separate representative with the passage of Republic Act No. 11243 on March 11, 2019, which segregated General Santos from the first congressional district of South Cotabato to form its own congressional district.

Given that it was already too late for the Commission on Elections to change the old congressional district configuration data in the automated election system in time for the May 2019 polls, COMELEC Resolution No. 10524 was promulgated on April 11, 2019, to delay the elections for both the new lone congressional district of General Santos and the newly reconfigured first congressional district of South Cotabato to a date no less than six months from May 13, 2019. By virtue of COMELEC Resolution No. 10552 promulgated on July 25, 2019, the date of elections for the lone district of General Santos was set for October 26, 2019.

However, on September 10, 2019, the Supreme Court of the Philippines declared COMELEC Resolution No. 10524 null and void for violating the law, when COMELEC set separate special elections for the reconfigured 1st Congressional District of South Cotabato and the newly created Lone Congressional District of General Santos instead of using the new district boundaries in the next regular (i.e., 2022) election, as RA 11243 intended. In the same ruling, the Supreme Court ordered COMELEC to convene a Special Provincial Board of Canvassers to proclaim the winning candidate, Shirlyn L. Bañas-Nograles who garnered 68.55% of the votes cast in the May 2019 election, as the duly elected representative of the 1st Congressional District of South Cotabato, including General Santos.

The Supreme Court ruling effectively sets the election of the first separate representative for General Santos to the 2022 elections.

Subsection c Section 1 of Republic Act No. 11243 designated General Santos as Third district of South Cotabato and it caused confusion of the bill's title AN ACT REAPPORTIONING THE FIRST LEGISLATIVE DISTRICT OF THE PROVINCE OF SOUTH COTABATO THEREBY CREATING THE LONE LEGISLATIVE DISTRICT OF GENERAL SANTOS CITY. House Representative Ferdinand Hernandez filed House Bill No. 10021 that officially mandate and legally clarify the City of General Santos as a lone district, separate from South Cotabato. It passed on House third and final reading on 15 September 2021 and on the Senate on 31 January 2022 with an amendment where the first election for the reapportioned seats will be on 2025. The bill lapsed into a law without then President Rodrigo Duterte's signature on June 2, 2022 and was indexed under Republic Act No. 11804

Lone District 
Population (2020): 697,315

See also 
Legislative district of Mindanao and Sulu
Legislative district of Cotabato
Legislative districts of South Cotabato

References 

General Santos
Politics of General Santos
Constituencies established in 2021